Hustad is a Norwegian surname which may refer to:

Donald Hustad (1918-2013), American composer of Christian music 
Jon Hustad (born 1968), Norwegian journalist 
Tormod Kristoffer Hustad (1889-1973) Norwegian councillor of state and minister in the pro-Nazi government of Vidkun Quisling

Norwegian-language surnames